Luis Leonardo Godoy Pizarro (born 14 May 1978) was a Chilean footballer.

He currently playing for clubs like Cobreloa or Deportes Antofagasta.

Honours

Player
Deportes Antofagasta
 Primera B (1): 2011 Apertura

References
 
 

1978 births
Living people
People from El Loa Province
Chilean footballers
Cobreloa footballers
Cobresal footballers
Unión La Calera footballers
C.D. Antofagasta footballers
Chilean Primera División players
Primera B de Chile players
Association football goalkeepers